Dominican University New York is a private college in Orangeburg, New York. It is chartered by the Board of Regents of the University of the State of New York and accredited by the Middle States Commission on Higher Education.

History 

Dominican University New York was founded as Dominican College of Blauvelt in 1952 by the Dominican Sisters of Blauvelt to offer a teacher preparation program for religious women. Five years later, the college was opened to lay students. In 1967, it became fully coeducational.

On May 17, 2022, the New York State Board of Regents approved the name change from Dominican College to Dominican University New York.

Athletics 
The Dominican athletic teams are called the Chargers. The university is a member of the Division II ranks of the National Collegiate Athletic Association (NCAA), primarily competing in the Central Atlantic Collegiate Conference (CACC) for most of its sports since the 1982–83 academic year. They are also a member of the Eastern College Athletic Conference (ECAC) for some sports.

Dominican competes in 17 intercollegiate varsity sports: Men's sports include baseball, basketball, cross country, golf, lacrosse, soccer, tennis and track & field; while women's sports include basketball, cross country, golf, lacrosse, soccer, softball, tennis, track & field and volleyball.

Rivalries 
The Chargers have a cross-campus rivalry with the St. Thomas Aquinas College Spartans since they are geographically a mile away from each other.

Notable alumni 

 Gerald P. Mallon, professor of social work
 Mary Kay Vyskocil, judge of the United States District Court for the Southern District of New York
 William Wise III, basketball player

References

External links
 Official website
 Official athletics website

 
Dominican universities and colleges in the United States
Educational institutions established in 1952
Universities and colleges in Rockland County, New York
Catholic universities and colleges in New York (state)
Association of Catholic Colleges and Universities
Former women's universities and colleges in the United States
1952 establishments in New York (state)